Neptune's Daughter may refer to:
 Neptune's Daughter (1914 film)
 Neptune's Daughter (1949 film)
 Neptune's Daughter (1906 play) at the New York Hippodrome